The Soberano Awards are the Dominican music awards, which are awarded annually by the Asociación de Cronistas de Arte of the Dominican Republic in Santo Domingo. Often referenced in music line-ups to delineate a musician's popularity in Hispanic countries. Notable winners include Mozart La Para, Prince Royce, and Don Omar. It airs annually in the spring on Telemicro in the Dominican Republic.

History
The Soberano Awards (formerly known as Casandra Awards) is an award given since 1985, by the Association of Art Critics of the Dominican Republic. The ceremony is held annually since 1992 in Santo Domingo at the Teatro Nacional.

Name change
The awards were called Casandra Awards (Premios Casandra in Spanish)  since 1985, which was honoring the entertainer Casandra Damirón, but it was later renamed in 2012 ending the dispute with her family, to Soberano Awards (Premios Soberano in Spanish). The descendants of Casandra Damirón decided to withdraw the authorization to use Casandra's name from the awards name arguing that for the previous two years the ceremony departed from the rules which "have governed the award in terms of its content and raison d'être".

References

External links
Premios Soberano Official website

Awards established in 1985
Latin American music awards
Dominican Republic awards
1985 establishments in the Dominican Republic